Milestones is an album by the Great Jazz Trio; pianist Hank Jones, bassist Ron Carter and drummer Tony Williams, recorded in 1978 for the Japanese East Wind label.

Reception 

Allmusic awarded the album 3 stars and its review by Scott Yanow states, "Excellent advanced modern mainstream music that features the three musicians almost operating as equals".

Track listing
 "Milestones" (Miles Davis) - 5:14
 "Lush Life" (Billy Strayhorn) - 6:02
 "Wave" (Antônio Carlos Jobim) - 7:00
 "Eighty-One" (Ron Carter) - 5:07
 "I Remember Clifford" (Benny Golson) - 4:53
 "Hormone" (Hank Jones) - 3:42
 "Mr. Biko" (Tony Williams) - 6:32

Personnel 
Hank Jones - piano
Ron Carter - bass
Tony Williams - drums

References 

1978 albums
Great Jazz Trio albums
East Wind Records albums